Waalwijk is a municipality and a city in the southern Netherlands. The villages of Capelle, Vrijhoeve-Capelle, Sprang (the former municipality of Sprang-Capelle) and Waspik together with the city of Waalwijk form the municipality of Waalwijk. The city has an old town center, which has recently been modernized.

Population centers

The city of Waalwijk 
Waalwijk is a city in North Brabant that lies north of Tilburg and west of 's-Hertogenbosch. To its north runs the river Bergse Maas. River Waal is further to the north.

Waalwijk used to be known for its shoe business.

Waalwijk was granted city rights in 1303. The professional football team RKC plays in Waalwijk.

Waalwijk is also known for an event in the city and surroundings: the "80 van de langstraat", held every September, in which a few thousand people make an 80-km walk through all towns that are part of the Langstraat region.

Some other events:
 Waalwijk Modestad (Waalwijk Fashion City), a weekend full of fashion
 Nacht van het levenslied (Night of the "Dutch song"), where Dutch and local singers perform
 Straattheaterfestival (street theatre festival), a weekend full of street performers and theatre acts

International relations

Twin towns — sister cities
Waalwijk is twinned with:

Notable people from Waalwijk

 Valensia, a Dutch composer, producer and multi-instrumentalist. Grew up in Waalwijk.
 Willem Hendrik Johan van Idsinga (1822 in Baardwijk – 1896), politician and Governor of the Dutch Gold Coast and Surinam
 Hendrikus Chabot (1894 in Sprang – 1949), painter and sculptor
 Martinus J. G. Veltman (born 1931 in Waalwijk – 2021), theoretical physicist, joint winner of the 1999 Nobel Prize in physics for work on particle theory
 René Mioch (born 1959 in Waalwijk), journalist and presenter for radio and TV 
 Juan van Emmerloot (born 1965 in Waalwijk), drummer, music producer and composer
 Jan-Hein Kuijpers (born 1968 in Waalwijk), lawyer and columnist
 Wieki Somers (born 1976 in Sprang-Capelle), designer
 Olcay Gulsen (born 1980 in Waalwijk), fashion designer
 Ariën van Weesenbeek (born 1980 in Waalwijk), drummer with the Dutch metal band Epica
 Bas van Daalen (born 1996 in Waalwijk), known as Will Grands, record producer, singer and songwriter

Sport 
 Frans Slaats (born 1912 in Waalwijk – 1993), professional cyclist who broke the world hour record
 Ramon van Haaren (born 1972 in Waalwijk), former footballer with 291 club caps
 Patrick van Balkom (born 1974 in Waalwijk), former sprinter, competed at the 2004 Summer Olympics
 Jos van Nieuwstadt (born 1979 in Waalwijk), former footballer with 310 club caps
 Yuri van Gelder (born 1983 in Waalwijk), gymnast on the rings, competed at the 2016 Summer Olympics
 Frank van Mosselveld (born 1984 in Waalwijk), former footballer with 266 club caps

See also
Besoijen
Baardwijk

Gallery

References

External links

 

 
Municipalities of North Brabant
Populated places in North Brabant